Disney Channel was a Russian free-to-air television channel which was launched on 10 August 2010 on pay television, replacing kids channel Jetix, and was later launched as a free-to-air network, replacing Seven TV on 31 December 2011. The network was one of the few Disney Channel variations which renders the word 'Channel' in a native language (in Cyrillic) within its logo and vocally (in Russian).

According to MediaScope, the coverage of Disney Channel was 49.6 million viewers, with the average of 2.9 million people watching the channel on a daily basis.

History

Original launch 
While Disney previously planned to launch Disney Channel Russia as an over-the-air service in 2009, their deal with a Russian media company was rejected by Russian authorities. A registration request was filed in 2010 with the Russian media authority Roscomnadzor.

On 9 March 2010, the Russian TV authority granted Walt Disney Company CIS a cable television broadcasting license (#15922). Later it was announced that the change would happen on 10 August 2010.

On 10 August at 06:00 PM (MSK), Disney Channel Russia replaced Jetix Russia, making it the last Jetix-branded channel in the world to close. The last Jetix program was an episode of Kid vs. Kat while the first program on Disney Channel was the premiere of the movie Finding Nemo, following a -minute introduction package.

Unlike many other Disney Channels in Europe, which broadcast a single video feed with several language tracks, this version was custom-made for Russia. Almost every title and logo on the channel was translated and adapted as well.

Free-to-air launch 
On 27 October 2011, following a meeting between Prime Minister Vladimir Putin (now the President of Russia) and the management of The Walt Disney Company and the UTH media group, Disney bought 49% of the shares of the Seven TV Channel.

On 31 December 2011 at 12:00 AM (MSK), Disney Channel Russia turned into a free-to-air television network by replacing terrestrial channel Seven TV at noon. Right after the Free-to-air launch, the word “Channel” in the Mickey Mouse ears logo has been replaced with a Russian word “Канал” (Kanal). The first program was Mickey's Twice Upon a Christmas.

Initially, Disney Channel Russia used to have an outdated "Ribbon" channel branding, that disappeared from other countries before the year 2010. In a slightly refreshed form, that branding remained in active use until August 2014. Disney Channel Russia never switched to the newer boxed logo, as it was meant to represent the mobile app, which was never available for the country.

On Friday, 1 August 2014, Disney Channel Russia, along with other Disney Channels Worldwide, rebranded with the new logo and identity, during its worldwide rebranding campaign.

Post-launch 
Since January 2016, after the amendments to the media law entered into force, according to which the participation of foreign capital in the domestic media is limited to 20%, UTH Holding became the owner of 80% of the TV channel, while The Walt Disney Company retained 20%.

In the fall of 2018, the Russian Disney Channel changed its own identity for the second time, as well as logo animation. This time they used a new identity, which is exclusive to the Russian channel. The logo has remained unchanged, although it was moved from the lower left to the lower right corner of the screen and it used a little lighter blue color and a different animation. Since then Disney Channel Russia never used the same logo animation or channel identity as any other version of the channel.

During Summer 2019, a new flat version of the logo was introduced, although the older 3D version of the logo still remained in more active use.

On 19 July 2021, Disney Channel updated to a 16:9 picture format.

For several months after the Russian invasion of Ukraine, the channel continued to broadcast, but all social media related to the channel ceased posting any new announcements or information and were suspended on 1 October 2022 along with all YouTube accounts. In addition to this, any active Pay TV channels Disney had in Russia were discontinued on October 1 as well, and replaced with original channels exclusive to Russia. The channel was replaced with Solntse on 14 December 2022, following their dissolution of the joint-venture between Media-1 and Disney itself.

Programming 
Unlike other regional versions, Disney Channel Russia broadcast kids-targeted content for younger audiences. Since 2014 it primarily broadcast Disney XD and Disney Junior animated series, with some rare exceptions. Starting from 12 August 2010, Disney Channel broadcast Playhouse programming. When the block used the said brand (using the localized version of the Playhouse Disney logo), it was starting early in the morning and it was staying on air until 12:00 p.m. This also applied to the block when it used the Russian localized version of the Disney Junior logo. Every year the block was airing less time than before until it ceased using said branding on 1 May 2020.

Early programming 
In the past it used to copy Eastern European Disney Channel feed, with the inclusion of former Jetix programming. This means there were primarily Disney Channel and Disney XD original live action series (Jessie, Austin & Ally, Good Luck Charlie, Lab Rats, Mighty Med, etc.) and rare animation from Disney Channel and Jetix (Phineas and Ferb, Kid vs. Kat, etc.).

2014-2019 
This, however, changed with the 2014 rebranding, when the channel slowly switched to kids television animation, including Disney XD and Disney Junior animated series, like Gravity Falls, Star vs. the Forces of Evil, DuckTales, Amphibia, as live action series were faded away to the point there were no any old or new shows presented on the channel due to different family and cultural values in Russia and financial problems.

Playhouse Disney was rebranded to use Disney Junior-like logo and identity. Also, starting that year, Disney Channel Russia introduced a new evening prime time block called "Большая Анимация" ("Full-length animation", literally Great/Big Animation). It consisted of Disney's theatrical movies. The block aired every day and started in 7:30 pm daily. It was intended to be a replacement to the earlier block "Your Bright Night!" (Russian: Твой Яркий Вечер!), which broadcast Disney Channel Original Movies and was shortly removed off the air after the 2014 rebranding.

2020-14/12/2022 
During the COVID-19 lockdown, live-action series returned to the network's schedule, along with Gabby Duran & the Unsittables during summer 2020.

Disney Channel Russia Original Productions 
Boljšie semejnye igry ("The Great Family Game", Большие семейные игры)
Èto moj rebenok?! ("Is this my child?!", Это мой ребенок?!)
Èto moja komnata! ("This is my room!", Это моя комната!)
Mama na 5+ ("Mama 5+", Мама на 5+)
Pravila stilja ("Style rules", Правила стиля)
Posle školy ("After School", После школы)
Prikoly na peremenke: Novaja škola ("As the Bell Rings: A New School", Приколы на переменке. Новая школа)
Ustami mladenca ("The mouth of the baby", Устами младенца)

See also 
 Jetix
 Jetix Play
 Seven TV
 Disney Channel (Central and Eastern Europe)
 Disney television series on Russian television
 2022 Russian invasion of Ukraine

References

External links 
 Disney Channel Russia official website
 Official news release by Walt Disney Company CIS

Russia
Defunct television channels in Russia
Children's television networks
Television channels and stations established in 2010
Television channels and stations disestablished in 2022
2010 establishments in Russia
2022 disestablishments in Russia